Avitis Institute of Medical Sciences is an Indian hospital based in Palakkad, Kerala, India. In May 2018, two of the hospital's executive directors, Santhi Promoth and Jyothy Palat, reached out to help the family of nurse Lini Puthussery. They learned nurse Lini had died within days of contracting the Nipah virus after dutifully attending to the first victim of the virus outbreak in Kerala. The executives promised they would see to it that the educational expenses of Lini's children, ages 2 and 5 at the time of her death, would be covered, beginning with the 2019 academic year and carrying forward to when they acquire a professional degree or begin a postgraduate course. In August 2018, the hospital again gained notability for their aid and rescue efforts when helping the victims of Nelliyampathy, Kerala after flooding and heavy rains caused 70 landslides making roads impossible from the upper reaches of the Nelliyampathy Mountains to the mainland.

Background
Avitis Institute of Medical Sciences, a unit of Avitis Super Speciality Hospitals Private Ltd, was founded by Prasanth Manghat and Promoth Manghat. Avitis provides the people of Nemara and underdeveloped rural areas of Palakkad District with a modern healthcare facility and much needed medical services.

Facilities
Avitis is a 200-bed multi-specialty hospital with qualified doctors, trained staff and modern medical technology for diagnosing and treating patients. The Radiology and Imaging Sciences Department has digital X-ray, ventilators, operation theatres with airflow systems, a blood bank, a 24-hour pharmacy and ambulatory services.

Services 

Centers of Excellence

Avitis Institute of Cardiac Sciences
Critical Cardiac Care
Physiological Studies
Cardiac, Thoracic
Lung and Vascular Surgeries
Cardiac Rehabilitation
Avitis Institute of Neuro Sciences
Epilepsy Management
Stroke
Movement Disorder
Neurosurgery
Neuro-rehabilitation
Avitis Institute of Gastro-intestinal and Hepato-biliary Sciences
Endoscopy
GI Bleed Care
Hepatology
Minimally Invasive Gastro Surgery

Avitis Institute of Renal Sciences
Nephrology
Dialysis Unit
Urology

Sub Specialties
Obstetrics and Gynaecology
 Paediatrics and Neonatology
 Orthopaedics and Sports Medicine
 Rheumatology
 Family Medicine
 Pulmonary Medicine
 ENT and Head & Neck Surgery
 Dermatology
 Dental & Maxillofacial Surgery
 Critical Care Medicine
 Emergency Medicine
 Internal Medicine
 General Surgery
 Anaesthesiology
 Mental Health
 Radio Diagnosis and Imaging Sciences
 Laboratory Medicine
 Transfusion Medicine
 Plastic Surgery

References

External links 

Hospitals in Kerala
Hospitals established in 2017
2017 establishments in Kerala